Lichnov is a municipality and village in Bruntál District in the Moravian-Silesian Region of the Czech Republic. It has about 1,000 inhabitants.

Administrative parts
The village of Dubnice is an administrative part of Lichnov.

Gallery

References

Villages in Bruntál District